The Federal Correctional Complex, Victorville (FCC Victorville) is a United States federal prison complex located in the Victor Valley of the Mojave Desert, in San Bernardino County, southern California. Abby Lee Miller served eight months of a 366-day sentence  there.

The prison complex is operated by the Federal Bureau of Prisons, a division of the United States Department of Justice.

Facilities
The FCC Victorville complex consists of three facilities:

 Federal Correctional Institution, Victorville (FCI I Victorville): a medium-security facility for male inmates
 Federal Correctional Institution, Victorville (FCI II Victorville): a medium-security facility for male inmates with a satellite prison camp that houses minimum-security female offenders.
 United States Penitentiary, Victorville (USP Victorville): a high-security facility for male inmates.

See also

 Federal Bureau of Prisons
 Incarceration in the United States
 List of U.S. federal prisons

References

Buildings and structures in San Bernardino County, California
Victorville
Prisons in California
Victor Valley
Victorville, California